Norton Sound is an inlet of the Bering Sea on the western coast of the U.S. state of Alaska, south of the Seward Peninsula. It is about 240 km (150 mi) long and 200 km (125 mi) wide. The Yukon River delta forms a portion of the south shore and water from the Yukon influences this body of water. It is ice-free from June to October.

Norton Sound was explored by Captain James Cook in September 1778.  He named the body of water after Sir Fletcher Norton, then Speaker of the British House of Commons.

The Norton Sound area has been home to Yup'ik and Inupiat for many centuries. It is the boundary between the two peoples; the Inupiat live to the north  and the Yup'ik to the south. The town of Nome is along the northern edge of Norton Sound. The villages of Elim, Golovin, Stebbins, White Mountain, Koyuk, Shaktoolik, St. Michael, and Unalakleet are on the shores or waterways flowing into Norton Sound. The Iditarod Trail Sled Dog Race runs through coastal villages between Unalakleet and Nome.

The seaplane tender USS Norton Sound was named after the inlet.

References

 

Bays of the Bering Sea
Bodies of water of Nome Census Area, Alaska
Sounds of Alaska